Arcana may refer to:

Music 
 Arcana (American band), an American jazz band
 Arcana (Swedish band), a Swedish dark wave band
 Arcana (record label), a French classical record label
 Arcana (album), a 2001 album by Edenbridge
 Arcana (Varèse), a classical composition by Edgard Varèse

Other uses 
 Arcana, Indiana, an unincorporated town in the United States
 Arcana (convention), a Minnesota dark fantasy/horror convention
 Arcana (film), a 1972 Italian horror-drama film
 Arcana (manga), a 2000 manga series by Yua Kotegawa
 Arcana (video game), a 1992 card-themed role-playing game
 Arcana, a collection of poems by A. W. Yrjänä
 Arcanacon, an Australian role-playing game convention
 Arcana Studio, a comic book company
 Major Arcana, the trumps of Tarot cards
 Minor Arcana, the numbered pip Tarot cards
 Knowledge (Arcana), a skill in the tabletop role-playing game Dungeons & Dragons

See also 
 Arcanna, a fictional superheroine in the Marvel Comics universe
 Arkana (disambiguation)
 Arcane (disambiguation)
 Arcanum (disambiguation)